Fairy Cottage Halt  (Manx: Stadd Bwaane ny Ferrishyn)  is an intermediate stopping place on the Manx Electric Railway on the Isle of Man on the outskirts of the village of Laxey.

Location
The stop is situated on the coast of Laxey Bay. It is only 500 yards from South Cape Halt, and this is the shortest distance between two main stations on the line. Access to the station is gained from the roadside behind a small local filling station and the halt caters almost exclusively for localised traffic.

Unusual usage
In 1998 as part of the year-long Steam 125 event on the island marking the milestone anniversary of the Isle of Man Railway this tranquil setting served as the terminating point for steam locomotive No. 1 Sutherland of 1873 which operated a number of special workings throughout the summer season to commemorate the birthday. There was some historical precedent for this, as the railway loaned out locomotives for use in conjunction with the construction of the electric line between 1893 and 1899.

Facilities
Today, the halt sees little traffic but remains complete with its corrugated iron shelter.

Route

See also
Manx Electric Railway stations

References

Sources
 Manx Manx Electric Railway Stopping Places (2002) Manx Electric Railway Society
 Island Island Images: Manx Electric Railway Pages (2003) Jon Wornham
 Official Official Tourist Department Page (2009) Isle Of Man Heritage Railways

Railway stations in the Isle of Man
Manx Electric Railway
Railway stations opened in 1894